Lanton is a village in the Scottish Borders area of Scotland, near Jedburgh and Timpendean Tower, off the A698.

See also
List of places in the Scottish Borders

External links

RCAHMS records for Lanton
RCAHMS: Lanton Moor
Gazetteer for Scotland: Lanton
Roman coins
Jedforest Trails: Lanton Moor and Timpendean Tower

Villages in the Scottish Borders